Cognac is an unincorporated community in Richmond County, North Carolina, United States.

History
A post office called Cognac was established in 1900, and remained in operation until 1953. The community was named after the liquor cognac, since this is a wine-growing district.

References

Unincorporated communities in Richmond County, North Carolina
Unincorporated communities in North Carolina